The Common Eligibility Test (or CET), is an upcoming examination in India to be started from year 2023 for recruitment of staff to non-gazetted posts in the State government of Haryana. The test will be conducted by National Testing Agency  which will function as a central agency of Indian Government . The setting up of the National Recruitment Agency for replacing multiple entrance examination with a single examination was approved by Union Cabinet of India on 19 August 2020..

The National Recruitment Agency shall conduct a separate CET each for the three levels of graduate, higher secondary (12th pass), and the matriculate (10th pass) candidates for various non-technical posts. Presently such tests are being conducted by SSC, IBPS, Railways, and various other organizations.

History
Presently multiple examinations by various agencies viz. Railways, IBPS, SSC are held for recruiting group B and C staff for various organizations of central govt. In the budget speech of 2020–21, the finance minister Nirmala Sitaraman proposed setting up National Recruitment Agency in order to replace multiple examinations for various government job recruitment in India by Central Govt.  The upcoming CET will replace all these exams, which will save job seekers time and energy from filling multiple forms and focusing on all the examinations.

Salient Features of NRA and CET
The CET will be held twice a year and the scores will be valid for the next three years from the date of declaration of result. The best of CET scores will be considered as the current score of the candidate.

Mode of Examination

The examination will be conducted as online examination, also the candidates will have to apply online for this examination.
This test will be based on a multiple-choice objective type question paper.

No. of Attempts
There will be no limit on the number of attempts for taking this examination, but the upper age limit will be there. However, the relaxation in the upper age limit shall be given to candidates of SC/ST/OBC and other categories as per the extant policy of the Government.

Exams Replaced by CET 
Here are the top three government exams by which the Common Eligibility Test gets replaced: Staff Selection Commission (SSC), NTPC Railway Recruitment Board (RRB), and Institute of Banking Personnel Selection (IBPS).

Medium of Examination

There are 22 languages in the Eighth Schedule of the Constitution of India, out of which this examination is conducted in 12 languages.

Examination Centers

For the ease of the candidates, each district will have at least one examination center, and in total around 1000 examination centers will be made.

Other features
The scores of CET will be shared  with central government, state government, union territories, public sector undertakings and private sector, and it can also be used for recruitment in their respective departments and agencies /companies.

References

Standardised tests in India
2020 in India